Roy Lindsay Kellock,  (November 12, 1893 – December 12, 1975) was a Canadian Justice of the Supreme Court of Canada.

Born in Perth, Ontario, he graduated from McMaster University with a B.A. in 1915.  Kellock was called to bar in 1920 and practised with the firm of WeirFoulds in Toronto.

In 1942 he was appointed to the Court of Appeal for Ontario.  Two years later, he was appointed as Puisne Justice of the Supreme Court of Canada on October 3, 1944 and served until January 15, 1958.  Roy Kellock chaired the Royal Commission investigating the Halifax Riot of VE Day 1945, and co-chaired the Royal Commission on Spying Activities in Canada in response to Gouzenko Affair in 1946.

In 1970, he was made a Companion of the Order of Canada.

References

External links
 Supreme Court of Canada biography

Justices of the Supreme Court of Canada
Justices of the Court of Appeal for Ontario
McMaster University alumni
Canadian people of Scottish descent
Chancellors of McMaster University
Companions of the Order of Canada
1893 births
1975 deaths